Pittsburg High School is a public high school located in Pittsburg, Texas (USA) and classified as a 4A school by the UIL. It is part of the Pittsburg Independent School District located in central Camp County. In 2015, the school was rated "Met Standard" by the Texas Education Agency.

Athletics
The Pittsburg Pirates compete in these sports - 

Baseball
Basketball
Cross Country
Football
Golf
Powerlifting
Soccer
Softball
Tennis
Track and Field
Volleyball
Swim
Wrestling

State Titles
Football - 
1980(3A)
Boys Track - 
1965(2A)

Notable alumni
 Koe Wetzel - singer and songwriter

References

External links
Pittsburg ISD
Pittsburg Athletic Booster Club

Public high schools in Texas
Schools in Camp County, Texas